Walter Anthony Gilbey (born 26 February 1935) is a British politician and entrepreneur, who is a former Member of the House of Keys on the Isle of Man.

Early life and career
Gilbey was born on 26 February 1935 to Sir Walter Gilbey, 2nd Baronet. He was educated at Eton College and became a merchant banker in London. His other business roles have included being the Finance Director of Distillers and Vinters Ltd. He was until 2008 a Director of the Isle of Man Steam Packet, but remains director of Vannin International Securities. Walter is also interested in hunting and is the Master of the Isle of Man Hunt and Secretary of the Isle of Man Horse Council.

In his 30s, he was elected to the Berkshire County Council and stood as the Conservative Party candidate for the House of Commons in Ealing Southall in 1974. Upon moving to the Isle of Man he unsuccessfully contested Glenfaba in 1976 and 1981 before being elected at the 1982 by election. He lost his seat in 2001 to David Anderson. During his time in government he was the Minister for Local Government and the Environment.

Business positions 
Chairman of Mannin Trust, 1972–82
Chairman of Mannin International, 1982–88
Director & Chairman of Vannin International Securities, 1972–present
Chairman of Mannin Industries, 1972–present
Director of Gilbey Farms Ltd., 1974–present
Director of Isle of Man Steam Packet Company, 1976–2008
Chairman of Manx Telecom, 1986–2010

Governmental positions
Chairman of the Financial Supervision Commission, 1991–99
Minister of Local Government and the Environment, 1999–2001

Personal life
Gilbey has been married to Jenifer (née Price) since 1964, they have 3 children together.

See also

References

1935 births
Living people
English bankers
English businesspeople
People educated at Eton College
Members of Berkshire County Council
Conservative Party (UK) parliamentary candidates
Members of the House of Keys 1981–1986
Members of the House of Keys 1986–1991
Members of the House of Keys 1991–1996
Members of the House of Keys 1996–2001
20th-century English politicians
21st-century English politicians